Brandon Wade (born Lead Wey; 1970) is an American businessman who is the founder and chief executive officer of InfoStream Group, an online dating company. He is a graduate of the Massachusetts Institute of Technology (MIT) and MIT Sloan School of Management and a former software engineer. He is best known for founding the sugar dating web site Seeking.com. Wade's web sites have been criticised for being comparable to escort services.

Early life
Born in Singapore to ethnic Chinese parents, Wade was raised in what he describes as a "Tiger Mom–type of upbringing" consisting of studying and not much else. While growing up in Singapore, Wade attended Saint Andrew's Secondary School and Hwa Chong Junior College.

In 1993, Wade graduated from Massachusetts Institute of Technology (MIT), where he received a Bachelor of Science in electrical engineering on an Overseas Merit Scholarship awarded by Singapore's Public Service Commission. Upon graduating in 1993, Wade opted to stay in the United States, breaking his contractual obligation to return to Singapore and forcing his parents to pay about $300,000 in damages. Wade then enrolled in the MIT Sloan School of Management, where he graduated with a Master of Business Administration in 1995.

Career
After completing his MBA, he moved to New York City to work for technology consultants Booz Allen. He later joined General Electric as a technology infrastructure manager.

Wade is the author of two books titled Seeking Arrangement: The Definitive Guide to Sugar Daddy and Mutually Beneficial Relationships  and Connecting with the IN Crowd: How to Network, Hang Out, and Play with Millionaires Online.

In a 2014 essay for CNN titled  "Dating website founder says love doesn't exist", Wade wrote, "Love is a concept invented by poor people."

Dating websites
In 2006, Wade founded the sugar dating website Seeking.com. In 2007, Wade launched a companion dating site WhatsYourPrice.com, a dating website where members bid for dates in an online auction environment. In May 2012 he launched MissTravel.com, which pairs 'generous' travelers with 'attractive' travelers who would love the opportunity to travel the world for free. Marlow Stern of The Daily Beast criticised MissTravel.com for its lack of safety precautions, including the high potential for sex trafficking. And in May 2015, Wade launched OpenMinded.com, a dating website that caters to those who are monogamish with the goal of providing a safe and stigma-free environment that brings the ease and flexibility of online dating to the currently underserved world of open relationships. He further states the website caters to those looking to engage in 'ethical cheating'.

In America, Wade has hosted Sugar Daddy dating events to publicise his sites. According to Wade, the website already has a large membership in the United Kingdom.

Wade's websites, which are based around rich men paying for dates with attractive women, have received controversy and criticism in the media, with Forbes, The Atlantic, ABC News and MSNBC all reporting on the moral ambiguity of the websites SeekingArrangement and WhatsYourPrice.com. The websites have been accused of treating their female members like prostitutes, with WhatsYourPrice.com being described as "indistinguishable from prostitution". It has been reported that a large proportion of women using the site are students, and about 40 percent of the male users are married men. Wade has strongly denied there is an illicit side to the site.

References

External links
 

1970 births
Living people
People from Singapore
Singaporean emigrants to the United States
Businesspeople from Las Vegas
MIT School of Engineering alumni
American company founders
MIT Sloan School of Management alumni